Korizan (also Romanized as Korīzān) is a village in Tang Chenar Rural District, in the Central District of Mehriz County, Yazd Province, Iran. At the 2006 census, its population was 10, in 4 families.

References 

Populated places in Mehriz County